Henry Bloomfield (born January 4, 1973 in Los Angeles, California) is a former American rugby union number eight. He was a member of the United States national rugby union team that participated in the 2007 Rugby World Cup.

References

External links 
Rugby World Cup 1987 - 2015: Complete Results and Statistics

1973 births
Living people
Rugby union props
American rugby union players
United States international rugby union players